Brutality Part 1 is a collaboration album Featuring Necro, Goretex, Ill Bill, Mr Hyde. Released under Necro's Psycho+Logical-Records

Track listing
 Necro – I'm Your Idol -  4:15
 Goretex – Dopesick (feat. Necro) -  3:43
 Ill Bill – Reign In Blood (feat. Necro) - 4:07
 Mr. Hyde – Street Veteran (feat. Necro) -  4:55
 Ill Bill – Swordfish -  4:04
 Necro – Anguish & Aggression - 2:37
 Goretex – The Big Sleep - 3:36
 Necro & Ill Bill – White Slavery - 3:57
 Goretex – Scumbags (feat. Necro) - 3:44
 Necro & Ill Bill – Frank Zito - 2:52
 Ill Bill – Our Life (feat. Necro) -  3:21
 Necro – Morbid Shit - 2:50
 Necro – Every Second Someone Dies - 3:20
 Necro – Fire - 3:02
 Necro – Talking Shit - 3:30
 Necro – Watch Ya Toes - 2:02
 Goretex – The Big Sleep (Remix) - 3:40

References 

Necro (rapper) albums
2003 albums
Collaborative albums
Psycho+Logical-Records albums